Nynehead is a village and civil parish in Somerset, England, situated on the River Tone,  south-west of Taunton and  north-west of Wellington, in the Somerset West and Taunton district.  The village has a population of 415.

History

The first documentary evidence comes from 737 when the manor was granted to the Bishop of Winchester. In 890 the land was granted to a Wulfhere Gidding. The parish of Nynehead was part of the Taunton Deane Hundred.

The village was the site of a boat lift on the Grand Western Canal, and the remains of two aqueducts are still standing.

Governance

The parish council has responsibility for local issues, including setting an annual precept (local rate) to cover the council’s operating costs and producing annual accounts for public scrutiny. The parish council evaluates local planning applications and works with the local police, district council officers, and neighbourhood watch groups on matters of crime, security, and traffic. The parish council's role also includes initiating projects for the maintenance and repair of parish facilities, as well as consulting with the district council on the maintenance, repair, and improvement of highways, drainage, footpaths, public transport, and street cleaning. Conservation matters (including trees and listed buildings) and environmental issues are also the responsibility of the council.

The village falls within the non-metropolitan district of Somerset West and Taunton, which was established on 1 April 2019. It was previously in the district of Taunton Deane, which was formed on 1 April 1974 under the Local Government Act 1972, and part of Wellington Rural District before that. The district council is responsible for local planning and building control, local roads, council housing, environmental health, markets and fairs, refuse collection and recycling, cemeteries and crematoria, leisure services, parks, and tourism.

Somerset County Council is responsible for running the largest and most expensive local services such as education, social services, libraries, main roads, public transport, policing and  fire services, trading standards, waste disposal and strategic planning.

It is also part of the Taunton Deane county constituency represented in the House of Commons of the Parliament of the United Kingdom. It elects one Member of Parliament (MP) by the first past the post system of election.

Landmarks
Nynehead Court dates from the late 14th century with major additions in 1675 and the 18th century. The Nynehead Hollow is another prominent landmark in the village. It is believed that the "Hollow" was dug out by the Sandford family in the hope of making Nynehead Court quicker to get to from the servant houses which were situated in east Nynehead.

Religious sites

The church, dedicated to All Saints, is a small structure built of mostly of local red Permo-Triassic rock, probably on the site of an earlier church, with a square tower containing five bells. The interior of the church contains some monuments to the Sandford family of Nynehead Court.

Sandford family

The best known member of the Sandford family is probably the Reverend John Sandford, who was vicar of Nynehead from 1811 to 1834.  From 1819  onwards he was largely an absentee clergyman living in Italy, where he made a controversial marriage to Elizabeth Georgiana Morgan, who had been divorced  in scandalous circumstances by her first husband, Valentine Lawless, 2nd Baron Cloncurry, after admitting to adultery with a neighbour. They had one daughter, Anna, Lady Methuen.

References

External links

Nynehead parish website

Villages in Taunton Deane
Civil parishes in Somerset
Grand Western Canal